The 1992 United States House of Representatives election in Montana were held on November 3, 1992 to determine who will represent the state of Montana in the United States House of Representatives. Montana had two seats, but lost a seat after being re-apportioned according to the 1990 United States Census.  Thus, incumbents from both seats competed for the at large district in the House.  Representatives are elected for two-year terms.

General Election

Results

References 

1992 Montana elections
Montana
1992